Nationality words link to articles with information on the nation's poetry or literature (for instance, Irish or France).

Events

Works published
Tosa Nikki by Ki no Tsurayuki. Poetic diary depicting a 935 journey from Tosa Province to Kyoto.

Births
Death years link to the corresponding "[year] in poetry" article. There are conflicting or unreliable sources for the birth years of many people born in this period; where sources conflict, the poet is listed again and the conflict is noted:

935:
 Abu Firas al-Hamdani (died 968), Arab poet

935:
 Hrotsvitha (died 1002), Latin language poet and dramatist from Saxony

936:
 Li Houzhu, born 936 or 937 (died 978), Song poet

939:
 Sri Ponna (died 968), writing in the Kannada language
 Fujiwara no Takamitsu (died 994), Heian period waka poet and Japanese nobleman

Deaths
Birth years link to the corresponding "[year] in poetry" article:

932:
 Fujiwara no Sadakata (born 873), Japan

933:
 Fujiwara no Kanesuke (born 877), one of the Thirty-six Poetry Immortals of Japan

934:
 Ibn Duraid (born 837), Arab poet and philologist

938:
 Lady Ise (born 875), a prominent woman waka poet

See also

 Poetry
 10th century in poetry
 10th century in literature
 List of years in poetry

Other events:
 Other events of the 12th century
 Other events of the 13th century

10th century:
 10th century in poetry
 10th century in literature

Notes

Poetry
10th-century poetry